Inaindha Kaigal is a 1990 Indian Tamil-language film action film directed by N. K. Viswanathan. The film stars Ramki, Arun Pandian, Nirosha and Sindhu, with Nassar, Senthil, Srividya, Murali Kumar and Prabhakaran playing supporting roles. The film, produced by Aabavanan who also wrote the script and lyrics, was released on 2 August 1990.

Plot
Disgraced traitor army doctor Chandralekha, also a grieving mother, asks an orphan ex-army man named David Kumar to rescue her son Gunasekaran, who is locked up in a enemy military prison across the border. David is in love with Julie, an orphan herself, and she is pregnant. He takes up the mission more out of patriotism and leaves for it.

At the same time, the hideous criminal P. K. Roy appoints a  clever, cunning and industrious criminal Pratap to bring the same Gunasekharan from prison. Both leave for their missions respectively often trying to out-do each other. Pratap falls in love with a girl while he is on mission. 

At one point in the mission, when Pratap's life is in danger, David risks his own to save him and they join hands (hence the title) agree to work together considering the level of danger in the mission. They go on to become blood brothers unaware that the purpose they are bringing back Gunasekaran to their mission head are at loggerheads. In the end, Roy is shown to be evil, kills David, who dies to while attempting to save Pratap and Gunasekaran. 

Meanwhile Julie dies in childbirth leaving Pratap to take vengeance as well as bring up the newborn.

Cast
Ramki as Pratap
Arun Pandian as Maj. David Kumar
Nirosha as Julie
Sindhu as Geetha
Srividya as Lt. Col. Chandralekha
Nassar as P. K. Roy
Senthil as Mani
A. R. S. as Lawyer Shanmugam
Prabhakaran as Gunasekaran
Murali Kumar as Ashok
Vellai Subbaiah as Sivaraman
K. S. Selvaraj
Vijay Ganesh as P. K. Roy's assistant
Charle as a singer (guest appearance)
Veera Raghavan in a guest appearance
Kullamani in a guest appearance as a hired-to-kill assassin targeting Pratap.

Soundtrack

The music was composed by Gyan Varma, with lyrics written by Aabavanan.

Reception
The Indian Express called it "ambitious and vast, brash, blatantly loud, empty and diffuse". A group of people reviewed the film for Kalki, praising the fight sequence and locations but felt there were too many songs.

Legacy
The film had an extraordinary opening and such that it created stampedes in Shanti theatre in Coimbatore, killing two persons. This led to the theatre's licence being cancelled until the theatre owner "toiled" to regain it. In 2013 Tamil film Sutta Kadhai, lead heroes of that film Balaji and Venkatesh appeared as fans of Ramki and Arun Pandian. In one scene, Balaji utters the film's title referring to their collaboration on a mission.

References

External links 
 

1990 action films
1990 films
1990s Tamil-language films
Fictional portrayals of the Tamil Nadu Police
Films directed by N. K. Vishwanathan
Films set in Chennai
Films shot in Chennai
Indian action films
Indian Army in films